is a district of Minato, Tokyo, Japan. As of February 1, 2020, the total population is 697.

Azabu-Mamianachō borders Azabudai on the north and east, Azabu-Nagasakachō on the west, and Higashiazabu on the south.

The district has one small ward park, whose total area is 1,771.90 meters squared.

It used to be called Iigura village (飯倉村, Iigura-mura).

Education
Minato City Board of Education operates public elementary and junior high schools.

Azabu-Mamianachō is zoned to Azabu Elementary School (麻布小学校) and Roppongi Junior High School (六本木中学校).

References 

Districts of Minato, Tokyo